The 2008 Junior Oceania Cup was an international field hockey tournament hosted by Australia. The quadrennial tournament serves as the Junior Championship of Oceania organized by the Oceania Hockey Federation. It was held in Brisbane, Queensland, Australia between 11 and 14 December 2008.

Australia and New Zealand were the only participating teams.

Australia won the tournament in both the men's and women's competitions. The tournament also served as a qualifier for the 2009 men's and women's Junior World Cups, with both Australia and New Zealand qualifying.

Men's tournament

Results
All times are local (UTC+10).

Pool

Matches

Women's tournament

Results
All times are local (UTC+10).

Pool

Matches

References

Junior Oceania Cup
International field hockey competitions hosted by Australia
Sports competitions in Brisbane
Junior Oceania Cup
2000s in Brisbane
Oceania Cup
Junior Oceania Cup
Oceania Cup